The Oak Hill Cemetery is a cemetery in Lawrence, Kansas. It was first constructed as a way for the people of Lawrence to remember those who were killed in Quantrill's Raid. Several prominent Kansans are buried there, including Charles L. Robinson, John P. Usher, and James H. Lane. It was built in 1866.

References

Lawrence, Kansas
National Register of Historic Places in Douglas County, Kansas
Cemeteries in Kansas
1866 establishments in Kansas